The Hocking Canal, in southeastern Ohio, was a small 19th century lateral/feeder canal of the Ohio-Erie Canal. It began in Carroll, Ohio (which was on the Ohio-Erie Canal) and ran to Athens, Ohio. It paralleled the Hocking River in most places, but also used the river where it was calm and navigable. The portions where the canal route ran in the Hocking River itself were called "slackwater" sections.

In 1829, southern Ohio private investors interested in transporting salt and other products to the marketplace faster decided to construct a branch canal from the Ohio and Erie Canal at Carroll, Ohio southward towards Lancaster. Excavation on the "Lancaster lateral" began in 1831.  This portion of the canal was completed September 4, 1838.  In the same year, the Lancaster Lateral was purchased by the state. Ohio subsequently contracted to extend the canal from Lancaster to Logan, Nelsonville, Chauncey and Athens, fifty-three miles from Carroll. The 56-mile canal was completed in 1843, although much of it was officially opened two years earlier.

Salt, coal, pork products, wool and lumber were shipped out, and furniture and iron products were brought into Lancaster, Athens and Hocking counties via the canal. It had 26 locks, 7 culverts, and an aqueduct crossing Monday Creek south of Nelsonville. Operation of the canal never proved profitable, least of all the 15-mile stretch between Nelsonville and Athens, where a number of salt works were located. Their owners, frustrated by the slow pace of the canal boats (4 miles per hour) and the unavailability of the canal in the winter when it often froze, began construction of the Columbus and Hocking Valley Railroad, which by 1857 competed with the canal for cargo.

During the American Civil War's famed Morgan's Raid, Confederate cavalry under Brig. Gen. John Hunt Morgan paused in Nelsonville and burned ten wooden canal boats. However, they failed to destroy a covered bridge over the Hocking Canal when citizens rushed to extinguish the blaze after the raiders rode off. This allowed Union cavalry to continue their pursuit of the fleeing Confederates.

Repeated flooding, especially in the late 19th century, severely damaged portions of the canal, and the railroad became the favored mode of transportation. In 1890, the canal was closed. Today, remnants of the canal basin are visible in places from a modern bikeway built on the old towpath. The former Lock #19 is preserved as a roadside park on the old US Route 33 in eastern Starr Township, west of Nelsonville in Hocking County. Other remnants include dams, aqueducts, and other locks. However, the last remnants of the Hocking Canal in the city of Athens were bulldozed in 1983 to make way for a housing development.

External links
  Map of canals in Ohio, the Hocking Canal (K) is in the lower middle

Canals in Ohio
Transportation in Athens County, Ohio
Transportation in Fairfield County, Ohio
Transportation in Hocking County, Ohio
Buildings and structures in Athens County, Ohio
Buildings and structures in Fairfield County, Ohio
Buildings and structures in Hocking County, Ohio
Canals opened in 1843
1843 establishments in Ohio